was a Japanese samurai of the Sengoku period, who served the Takeda clan.

Samurai
1561 deaths
Year of birth unknown